Ermentrude de Roucy (958 – 5 May 1005) (Irmtrude) was a Countess and Duchess of Burgundy.

She was a daughter of Renaud of Roucy and his wife, Alberade of Lorraine, daughter of Gilbert, Duke of Lorraine.

Ermentrude married Aubry II of Mâcon and thus became a countess of Mâcon. They were the parents of:

 Létaud, archbishop of Besançon;
 Aubry, abbot of Saint-Paul de Besançon;
 Béatrice de Mâcon (974–1030), who was married in 975 to Count Geoffrey I of Gâtinais, and afterwards to the Count Hugues du Perche;
 Perhaps a daughter, N de Mâcon, the putative spouse of Eble de Poitiers, son of William IV of Aquitaine and Emma of Blois; they were possibly the parents of Ebles I of Roucy and all of his siblings, including Yvette de Roucy, the wife of either Manasses II or Manasses III of Rethel.

She also married Otto-William, Count of Burgundy. They had children:
Guy I of Mâcon;
Matilda, married Landri of Nevers;
Gerberga, married William II of Provence;
Reginald I, Count of Burgundy;
Agnes of Burgundy, Duchess of Aquitaine.

References

References

Countesses of Burgundy
Duchesses of Burgundy
958 births
1005 deaths